Bujanda is a village in Álava, Basque Country, Spain. At its largest, the village had around 150 inhabitants; but migration in the 1960s resulted in a great reduction in population.

Etymology 

The place name appears as Buszanda for the first time in a document dated in the year 1071. Then, Buxanda appears in several records (such as the Record of Ordinances of Alava). Later the  became in the modern sound j, which is the form used in the current official name (Bujanda). It may mean "place of boxwood" from the Latin buxus plus the locative suffix  -anda.

Geography

Bujanda belongs orographically to the upper basin of the river Ega. Bujanda is located at the southern tip of the Nature Park of Izki.

Altitude: 
Latitude: 42°40'25" N
Longitude: 2º24'19" W

Transportation 
 Bus Vitoria-Estella, Vitoria-Calahorra, stopping at Antoñana, .

Demographics

According to the census of 1960, Bujanda then had 97 inhabitants. But since that date the population has experienced a setback, falling by two-thirds in only fifteen years. The census of 1975 counted 34 people, and that was more than double the 16 of 2008: 11 men and 5 women, the lowest population to date. , the latest available data, there are 19 people: 14 men and 5 women.

From the late sixteenth century (the earliest date when census data were recorded) until the mid-nineteenth century, the population generally increased; but from then on there has been a gradual decline, accentuated during the important agricultural transformation of the 1960s:
In the late sixteenth century: 75 people
In the late eighteenth century: 100 people
In the mid- nineteenth century: 150 people
In 1900: 124 people
In 1930: 113 people
In 1960: 97 people
In 2008: 16 people
In 2014: 19 people

Administrative arrangements 
Bujanda has its own mayor, elected by the village inhabitants. The latest elections took place in December 2013, and the winning candidate received four votes.

Bujanda is part of the municipality of Campezo, together with Antoñana, Oteo, Orbiso and Santa Cruz de Campezo.

Festivals and customs

Prayers to San Fausto Labrador
According to chronicles of the historian , San Fausto Labrador originally came from Alguaire, Lleida, Catalonia. He devoted himself to the poor and needy from his youth. He was taken prisoner by the Saracens during a voyage in the Mediterranean, and made slave to a master who beat him whenever he prayed. One day, the master was astonished to see the farm implements labouring of their own volition while the saint was at prayer. The saint baptised him, and the two of them travelled to Alguaire. When San Fausto was near death, he said to his relatives and friends: "after my death, lay my body on my horse, and the place to where God leads it, there you shall leave me." He must have died around the year 614. Relatives and friends obeyed his request, and the horse finally stopped at Bujanda.

The villages which offer prayers to San Fausto are:
Antoñana, San Roman, Corres and Bujanda (the Concord)
Rosselló (Lleida), after Easter
Iruraiz-Gauna ( Llanada Alavesa ), Saturday September
Valles de Laminoria and Arraya
Orbiso , Day of San Prudencio 
Ancín (Navarra), day of San Isidro
Genevilla (Navarra), last Sunday in May
Apellániz (valle de Arraya), Sunday of Pentecost
Santa Cruz de Campezo
Barriobusto (Rioja Alavesa), Sunday before Pentecost
Labraza (Rioja Alavesa), Sunday of Pentecost
, Sunday after Corpus Christi
Alguaire (Lleida), first Sunday of July

Festivities
They are celebrated the first weekend of October. The celebration usually includes the following activities:
Friday
Opening speech and fireworks
Fellowship dinner
Saturday
Ascent of Mount Soila
Mass
Popular Chorizada
Card-playing championships at brisca (women) and mus (men)
Costume competition
chocolatada (Hot chocolate) 
Verbena (Music)
Sunday
Dancing pasacalles
Mass of Concord (San Roman, Corres, Antoñana and Bujanda)
Inflatable castle
Final championship of cards (brisca and mus)
Games for children

See also
 Campezo
 Antoñana
 Orbiso

References

External links
 Our Villages Bujanda. Arciprestazgo de la Montaña Alavesa
 La senda Bujanda: Por el desfiladero de Corres . Departamento de Turismo. Gobierno Vasco.
 Photos at Panoramio.com
  Twitter account of Bujanda

Populated places in Álava